Igabi is a Local Government Area (LGA) of Kaduna State, Nigeria. It is chaired by the Executive Chairman - Jabir Khamis, It is one of 774 local government areas in Nigeria. Rigasa ward is under Igabi LGA, one of the largest ward in terms of population in Nigeria.

History 
Research by the dRPC Nigeria (development Research and Projects Center Nigeria) has shown that Igabi was founded by a man from Kukawa in Borno state, the man was a Qur'anic scholar who settled near Rigachikun to teach Qur'an and Islamic studies in the region due to an overflow of Hausa people to the northeastern Nigeria specially Borno state in search of Islamic religious knowledge. The current local government's capital is Turunku. The genesis of Igabi town that led to local government was a man name Igabi who came and settled in the area. The man was from Borna named Mallam Ahmadu, an Islamic scholar who arrived at the site where he founded the town with a large number of Almajirai (students), numbering more than a hundred. Later more students from neighboring villages around joined him.

in 1907, Igabi was officially recognized as a district under Zazzau Emirate by the British colonial government of Northern Nigeria and the first district head was Turaki Babba of Zazzau. After the death of Turaki Babba in the early 1950s the leadership was transferred to Dan Madami Zubairu, then to Dan Madami Umaru and now Bello Sani.

The first confirmed H5N1 (bird flu) outbreak in an African country was on February 8, 2006, on a commercial chicken farm in Jaji, a village in Igabi.

Demographic 
The indigenous people of Igabi are predominantly Muslims with the exception of Gbagyi who were non Muslims or traditionalist and they later accepted Christianity.

Wards

 Afaka
 Birnin Yero
 Gadan Gayan
 Gwaraji
 Igabi ward
 Kerawa
 Kwarau
 Rigachikun
 Rigasa
 Sabon Birni
 Jaji
 Turunku
 Zangon Aya

Education 

There are primary, secondary and tertiary education institutions in Igabi. The first Igabi primary school was established in 1945 at Rigachikun.

The Armed Forces Command and Staff College is a military training institution which was founded in May 1976, so also Demonstration Battalion, The Army School of Artillery are located at Jaji.

The Nigerian Tulip International College (NTIC) formerly Nigerian Turkish is located at Rigachikun.

Economy 
The economy of Igabi largely depends on agriculture and makes it one of the largest contributors to the domestic product in the state, with a total output of about $10m. Igabi contribute economically to kaduna state in term of production of maize in large quantity. Also production of feed for animals consumption this led to socio - economic growth.

References 

Local Government Areas in Kaduna State